Volodymyr Oleksandrovych Yemets (3 April 1937 – 9 November 1987) was a Soviet Ukrainian footballer and manager.

External links
 

1937 births
1987 deaths
People from Nikopol, Ukraine
Soviet footballers
Ukrainian footballers
Association football defenders
FC Dnipro players
Soviet Top League managers
FC Elektrometalurh Nikopol managers
FC Dnipro managers
FC Zimbru Chișinău managers
Soviet football managers
Sportspeople from Dnipropetrovsk Oblast